The High Commissioner of the United Kingdom to Ghana is the United Kingdom's foremost diplomatic representative in the Republic of Ghana, and head of the UK's diplomatic mission in Ghana.

As fellow members of the Commonwealth of Nations, the United Kingdom and Ghana conduct their diplomatic relations at governmental level, rather than between Heads of State.  Therefore, the countries exchange High Commissioners, rather than ambassadors.

List of heads of mission

High Commissioners to Ghana

1957–1959: Sir Ian Maclennan
1959–1961: Sir Arthur Snelling
1961–1964: Sir Geoffrey de Freitas
1964–1966: Sir Harold Smedley
1967–1970: Horatio Matthews
1970–1975: Henry Stanley
1975–1978: Frank Mills
1978–1983: Sir James Mellon
1983–1986: Kevin Burns
1986–1989: Arthur Wyatt
1989–1992: Sir Anthony Goodenough
1992–1996: David Walker
1996–2000: Ian Mackley
2000–2004: Dr Roderick Pullen
2004–2007: Gordon Wetherell
2007–2011: Nicholas Westcott
2011–2014: Peter Jones
2014–2017: Jon Benjamin

2017–: Iain Walker 
2021 - present: Harriet Thompson

References

External links
UK and Ghana, gov.uk

Ghana
 
Ghana and the Commonwealth of Nations
United Kingdom